Magdolna Gulyás (7 July 1949 – 14 June 2014) was a Hungarian basketball player. She competed in the women's tournament at the 1980 Summer Olympics.

References

External links
 

1949 births
2014 deaths
Hungarian women's basketball players
Olympic basketball players of Hungary
Basketball players at the 1980 Summer Olympics
People from Karcag
Sportspeople from Jász-Nagykun-Szolnok County